Louis VII, Landgrave of Hesse-Darmstadt (22 June 1658 – 31 August 1678) was a
sovereign ruler of Hesse-Darmstadt, one of the branches of the House of Hesse.

Early life 
Louis VII was the son of Landgrave Louis VI of Hesse-Darmstadt and his wife Maria Elisabeth of Holstein-Gottorp.

Reign 
Following the death of his father, he began to reign as Landgrave on 24 April 1678. He reigned only 18 weeks and four days before he died from an infection on 31 August 1678.

Ancestors 

|-

References 

1658 births
1678 deaths
House of Hesse-Darmstadt